Kohima District is a district of the Indian state of Nagaland. It is the home of the Angami Nagas. As of 2011, it is the second most populous district of Nagaland (out of then-12, now 16), after Dimapur with a population of 267,988, 45% of which is urban. The district is home to 13.55% of Nagaland's entire population. The administrative headquarters of the district is located at Kohima, the capital city of Nagaland.

History 
Prior to India's independence, the area was part of Naga Hills District, with Kohima as the district headquarters.

Kohima District was created as one of the three districts of the newly inaugurated of Nagaland state on 1 December 1961. In 1973, the new districts of Phek and Wokha were created out of Kohima District, as in 1997 Dimapur District was similarly carved out. Peren District was carved out in 2003. The 2021 creation of Tseminyü District left Kohima District in its current form.

Geography 
Kohima District has a hilly landscape - Kohima Urban Area, typical of the area, is stretched along the top of a mountain. The district is bounded by Tseminyü District to the north, Zünheboto District to the northeast, Phek District to the east, Senapati District of Manipur to the south, Peren to southwest and Chümoukedima District to the west.

Flora and fauna 
It is a natural habitat for Blyth’s Tragopan.

Climate

Administration 
Kohima District is administered by a Deputy Commissioner, who has a number of Additional Deputy Commissioners (ADCs) and Sub-Division officers (SDOs) with responsibilities for each of the administrative circles. There exists also a District Urban Development Agency for Kohima. The current Deputy Commissioner of Kohima District is Shanavas C.

Kohima District is subdivided into the five administrative circles of Chiephobozou, Botsa, Kezocha, Jakhama, Kohima Sadar and Sechü–Zubza. These administrative circles are grouped into three Rural Development Blocks, which are Kohima (for Kohima Sadar and Sechü–Zubza), Chiephobozou (for Chiephobozou, Botsa and some of Kezocha) and Jakhama (for Jakhama and the rest of Kezocha).

Urban and rural centres 
Kohima Sadar circle comprises two towns:
 Kohima (99,039), Kohima Village (15,734), and the two villages of Chiedema (1,820), Chiede Model Village (277).

Jakhama circle comprises ten towns and villages:
 Viswema (7,417), Jakhama HQ (5,216), Khuzama (5,160), Jakhama Village (4,695), Kigwema (3,872), Phesama (3,061), Mima (2,149), Kigwe Town (1,228), Pfuchama (870), Swe–ba (388).

Chiephobozou circle comprises eighteen villages:
 Zhadima (3,184), Chiechama (3,172), Rüsoma (1,903), Chiephobozou (1,841), Nerhema (1,678), Tsiese Basa (1,563), 4th NAP Battalion Thizama (1,505), Meriema (1,233), Thizama (803), Tsiese Bawe (620), Viphoma (456), Nachama (422), Phekerkrie Bawe (301), Nerhe Model (301), Phezha (285), Ziezou (245), Phekerkrie Basa (147), Viphoma Basa (33).

Sechü–Zubza circle comprises sixteen villages:
 Sechü Zubza (4,460), Jotsoma (2,458), Phezhu (2,391), Mezoma (2,177), Khonoma (1,943), Peducha (1,087), Mengujuma (537), Kiruphema Basa (462), Sechüma (419), Thekrejüma (316), Sirhi Angami (286), Mezo Basa (285), Kiruphema Bawe (237), Dzuleke (156), Khonoma Basa (96), Hydro Project Station (59).

Kezocha circle comprises ten villages:
 Kidima (7,160), Sakhabama (2,857), Kezoma (2,117), Dihoma (1,550), Kezo Town (1,122), Kijümetouma (638), Kezo Basa (490), Mitelephe (245), Kijümetou Basa (149), Kezocha Hq (139).

Botsa circle comprises ten villages:
 Tuophema (2,236), Botsa (1,063), Gareiphema (952), Seiyhama (903), Teichüma (610), Tsiemekhuma Bawe (288), Tsiemekhuma Basa (283), Tuophe Phezou (132), Gareiphe Basa (122), Seiyha Phesa (106).

Demographics 

According to the 2011 census of India Kohima District has a population of 267,988, of which 121,088 or 45% lived in urban areas. This gives it a ranking of 576th in India (out of a total of 640). Kohima district has a sex ratio of 928 females for every 1000 males, and a literacy rate of 85%.

The main indigenous inhabitants of Kohima District are the Angami Nagas.

Religion 

Christianity is the largest religion in the district, followed by 85% of the people. Hinduism is the second-largest religion with 11% adherents. Islam and Other religions form 1.8% and 0.57% of the population respectively.

Languages 
The following languages are spoken in Kohima District:
Angami–Pochuri languages
Angami language

Government and Politics

The district has seven assembly constituences, namely, Kohima Town, Northern Angami I, Northern Angami II,  Southern Angami I, Southern Angami II and Western Angami. The last elections were held in 2023. The next legislative assembly election will be held in 2028.

As part of the Lok Sabha, Kohima District is part of the Nagaland Lok Sabha constituency. In the 2019 Indian general election, Tokheho Yepthomi of the NDPP won by 16,000 votes over his rival K.L. Chishi of the Indian National Congress. The next general election is in 2024.

Economy

Agriculture 
Agriculture forms the major economic activity in the district. Most of the agriculturists in the district practice Shifting cultivation or Jhum cultivation. The main crop  in the district is Paddy. Maize is another cereal produced in the district. Other major crops grown in the district are Potatoes, Ginger, Soybean and Ricebean. Among vegetables and fruits, Pineapples, Oranges, Cabbages, Tomatoes, Papayas, etc. are grown throughout the district.

Animal husbandry 
Animal husbandry acts as a supplementary income for the people in Kohima district. The sector also provides employment to small and marginal farmers. As per the Livestock Census in 2007, the most prevalent type of livestock in the district are Fowls, Cattles and Pigs.

Industry 
There are no large industries in the district. However, there are numerous Small and medium-sized enterprises. The number of MSMEs registered in the district till 2009-10 numbered to 52 which employed around 571 persons. The Angami Nagas in the district are skilled artisans and craftsmen.

Education 
As per the 2011 Census of India, Kohima District as a literacy rate of 85.23%. Literacy among the Scheduled Tribes stands at 83.86% with male literacy at 79.6% and female literacy at 88.45%. There are numerous colleges in the district.

Colleges 

Alder College, Kohima
Baptist College, Kohima
Capital College of Higher Education, Kohima
College of Arts and Technology, Nerhe–Phezha
Faith Theological Seminary, Kohima
Japfü Christian College, Kigwema
Kohima Bible College, Kohima
Kohima College, Kohima
Kohima Law College, Kohima
Kohima Science College, Jotsoma
Kros College, Kohima
Model Christian College, Kohima
Modern College
Modern Institute of Teacher Education, Kohima
Mount Olive College, Kohima
Mountain View Christian College, Kohima
National Institute of Electronics & Information Technology (NIELIT), Kohima
Oriental College, Kohima
Sazolie College, Jotsoma
Shalom Bible Seminary, Sechü Zubza
St. Joseph's College, Jakhama
State College of Teacher Education, Kohima

Universities 

Indira Gandhi National Open University (IGNOU) Regional Centre, Kohima
Nagaland University, Meriema Campus
The Global Open University, Kohima

Sports

Football 
Kohima District is home to Kohima Komets, a professional football club that plays in the Nagaland Premier League. The Indira Gandhi Stadium, Kohima is a multipurpose stadium mainly used for football. It has an artificial turf.

Wrestling 
Kene or Naga Wrestling is the most popular traditional sport in the region. The Naga Wrestling Championship held biennially at the Khuochiezhie Local Ground in Kohima.

Tourism 

Kohima District has various tourist places to visit. Below are few of the tourist attractions in the district:

Dzüko Valley 

Between November and March, the valley is dotted with red and white rhododendrons and wildflowers.

Khonoma Village 

Khonoma is an ancient Angami village known for its greenery and terraced fields. The village lies 20 kilometres west of Kohima.

Kisama Heritage Village 

Kisama Heritage Village is a heritage village located 13 kilometres south of Kohima city. The Heritage Village is the venue of the annual Hornbill Festival.

Kohima War Cemetery 

Kohima War Cemetery is a World War 2 cemetery. It is maintained by the Commonwealth War Graves Commission.

Mount Japfü 

Mount Japfü is the highest peak in the district. The world's tallest Rhododendron trees are found in the Japfü ranges. The range is also known for its trails and treks. Located 15 kilometres from Kohima, the Japfü peak offers views of Kohima city and the Himalayas.

Nagaland State Museum 

Nagaland State Museum or Kohima State Museum was established in 1970 as a multi-purpose stadium. The museum today presents ancient traditional Naga weaponry, traditional Naga clothes, etc.

Tuophema Tourist Village 
Tuophema is a heritage village located 36 kilometres north of Kohima.

Transportation

Air 
The nearest airport is Dimapur Airport, located 65 kilometres from the district headquarters Kohima. There are several helipads in Kohima District. Kohima Chiethu Airport is a planned airport to be built in Kohima. The Ministry of Defence gave the No-Objection Certificate (NOC) to construct the civil airport. It will be the second airport in Nagaland after Dimapur Airport.

Rail 
The nearest railway stations are the Chümoukedima Shokhuvi Railway Station and Dimapur Railway Station. The Dhansiri–Zubza line is an under-construction railway line which will connect Kohima with Dimapur via railways. The Kohima Zubza railway station in Zubza, 17 kilometres from Kohima City is currently under-construction. The Government of India has set 2023 as the deadline to connect all Northeastern state capitals with railways.

Road 
The district is well-connected with roads and highways. The NH 2 and NH 29 pass through the district alongside other intra-district roads. Nagaland State Transport buses are available from Dimapur for Kohima. Private taxis can be availed as well.

Notable people

Notes

References

External links

Official sites
 Official site
 Nagaland Tourism
 Tourist Places in Kohima district

Kohima district
Districts of Nagaland
1963 establishments in Assam